Orchilla may refer to:

 La Orchila, an island
 "Orchella weeds," a lichen that is a source of a purple-blue dye extracted from orcein
 Punta Orchilla Lighthouse on El Hierro, in the Canary Islands